The 1957 European Rowing Championships were rowing championships held on the Wedau Regatta Course in the city of Duisburg which, at the time, was located in West Germany. Men competed in all seven Olympic boat classes (M1x, M2x, M2-, M2+, M4-, M4+, M8+), and women entered in five boat classes (W1x, W2x, W4x+, W4+, W8+). Many of the men competed two months later at the Olympic Games in Melbourne; women would first be allowed to compete at Olympic level in 1976. Women competed from 23 to 25 August. Men competed the following week.

Background
FISA, the International Rowing Federation, decided at its congress held just prior to the 1955 Championships in Ghent to award the 1956 Championships to Bled, and that the 1957 Championships were to be hosted by Duisburg.

Medal summary – women's events

Medal summary – men's events

References

European Rowing Championships
European Rowing Championships
Rowing
Rowing
Sport in Duisburg